Maculabatis arabica, the Arabic whipray, is a species of stingray in the family Dasyatidae.
It is found in the Indian Ocean: around Pakistan and India,  and also found in the Arabian Sea.

References

arabica
Taxa named by Bernadette Mabel Manjaji-Matsumoto
Taxa named by Peter R. Last
Fish described in 2016